Magnus Hallman (7 March 1883 – 16 August 1937) was a Swedish sports shooter. He competed in two events at the 1924 Summer Olympics.

References

External links
 

1883 births
1937 deaths
Swedish male sport shooters
Olympic shooters of Sweden
Shooters at the 1924 Summer Olympics
People from Åre Municipality
Sportspeople from Jämtland County